Molika-Liko is a community council located in the Mokhotlong District of Lesotho. Its population in 2006 was 6,239.

Villages
The community of Molika-Liko includes the villages of Bokhina-Pere, Ha Botsipane, Ha Molopo, Ha Monaheng, Ha Moroke, Ha Seema, Khonofaneng, Lehlakaneng, Lepatsong, Letlapeng, Linareng, Liotloaneng, Lithakong, Mabuleng, Mafulane, Mahausung, Makukutoaneng, Manyareleng, Marumong, Masheaneng, Matebeleng, Matlakeng, Matsatsaneng, Molikaliko, Ntsoana-tsatsi, Phatlalla, Phuthing, Pitsaneng, Rapeising, Sixteen, Taung, Teraeng, Thaba-li-mpe, Thabana-li-'Mele and Thoteng.

References

External links
 Google map of community villages
 Hrusa, John. A Vital Link, photoblog.msnbc.msn.com

Populated places in Mokhotlong District